Ferenc Cziráki (19 November 1913 in Budapest – 5 August 1986 in Budapest) was a Hungarian field handball player who competed in the 1936 Summer Olympics. He was part of the Hungarian field handball team, which finished fourth in the Olympic tournament. He played four matches.

References

1913 births
1986 deaths
Hungarian male handball players
Olympic handball players of Hungary
Field handball players at the 1936 Summer Olympics
Handball players from Budapest